Archduchess Maria may refer to a number of historical noblewomen of Austria:

 Maria Christina, Duchess of Teschen (1742–1798), Archduchess of Austria

Archduchess Maria of Austria-Este
 Archduchess Laetitia Maria of Austria-Este (born 2003)
 Archduchess Luisa Maria of Austria-Este (born 1995)
 Princess Maria Laura of Belgium, Archduchess of Austria-Este (born 1988)

Archduchess Maria of Austria
 Maria of Austria, Duchess of Jülich-Cleves-Berg (1531–1581), daughter of Holy Roman Emperor Ferdinand I and Anna of Bohemia and Hungary
 Archduchess Maria of Austria (1584–1649), daughter of Ferdinand II, Archduke of Austria and Anne Juliana Gonzaga
 Archduchess Maria Anna of Austria (1610–1665), Electress of Bavaria
 Archduchess Maria Anna of Austria (governor) (1718–1744), Duchess of Lorraine
 Archduchess Maria Anna of Austria (1738–1789), second and eldest surviving daughter of Emperor Francis I and Maria Theresa of Austria
 Archduchess Maria-Anna of Austria, Princess Galitzine (b. 1954), daughter of Archduke Rudolf of Austria and Countess Xenia Czernichev-Besobrasov
 Archduchess Maria Johanna Gabriela of Austria (1750–1762), daughter of Francis I, Holy Roman Emperor and Maria Theresa of Austria, Holy Roman Empress
 Archduchess Maria Josepha of Austria (1751–1767), daughter of Francis I, Holy Roman Emperor and Maria Theresa of Austria, Holy Roman Empress
 Archduchess Maria Maddalena of Austria (1589–1631), better known as Maria Maddalena which was Italian for Magdalena 
 Archduchess Maria Theresa of Austria (1684–1696), daughter of Leopold I, Holy Roman Emperor and Eleonore-Magdalena of Pfalz-Neuburg
 Archduchess Maria Magdalena of Austria (1689–1743), daughter of Emperor Leopold I and Eleonore-Magdalena of Pfalz-Neuburg
 Archduchess Maria Theresa of Austria (1762–1770), daughter of Joseph II, Holy Roman Emperor and Isabella Maria of Parma
 Maria Theresa of Austria (1767–1827), Queen consort of Saxony
 Maria Leopoldina of Austria (1797–1826), Archduchess of Austria, Empress of Brazil and Queen of Portugal
 Archduchess Maria Anna of Austria (1804–1858), daughter of Francis II, Holy Roman Emperor and Maria Theresa of the Two Sicilies

See also

 Duchess Maria (disambiguation)
 Grand Duchess Maria (disambiguation)
 Archduchess Maria Anna of Austria (disambiguation)
 Archduchess Maria Magdalena of Austria (disambiguation)
 Archduchess Marie (disambiguation)